Kaluga is a city and the administrative center of Kaluga Oblast, Russia. Population: 

Kaluga's most famous resident, the space travel pioneer Konstantin Tsiolkovsky, worked there as a school teacher from 1892 to 1935. The Tsiolkovsky State Museum of the History of Cosmonautics in Kaluga is dedicated to his theoretical achievements and to their practical implementations for modern space research, hence the motto on the city's coat of arms: , Kolybélʹ kosmonávtiki (The Cradle of Space-Exploration").

History 
Kaluga, founded in the mid-14th century as a border fortress on the southwestern borders of the Grand Duchy of Moscow, first appears in the historical record in chronicles in the 14th century as Koluga; the name comes from Old Russian kaluga - "bog, quagmire". During the period of Tartar raids it was the western end of the Oka bank defense line. The Great stand on the Ugra River was fought just to the west. In the Middle Ages Kaluga was a minor settlement owned by the Princes Vorotynsky. The ancestral home of these princes lies southwest of the modern city.

On 19 January 1777 the Kaluga drama theatre opened its first theatrical season, established with the direct participation of the Governor-General M. N. Krechetnikov.

Kaluga is connected to Moscow by a railway line and by the ancient roadway, the Kaluga Road (now partly within Moscow (as Starokaluzhskoye Shosse - the Old Kaluga Highway), partly the A101 road). This road offered Napoleon his favored escape route from the Moscow trap in the fall of 1812. But General Kutuzov repelled Napoleon's advances in this direction and forced the retreating French army onto the old Smolensk road, previously devastated by the French during their invasion of Russia.

On several occasions during the Russian Empire Kaluga was the residence of political exiles and prisoners such as the last Crimean khan Şahin Giray (1786), the Kyrgyz sultan Arigazi-Abdul-Aziz (1828), the Georgian princess Thecla (1834–1835), and the Avar leader Imam Shamil (1859–1868).

The German army briefly occupied Kaluga during the climactic Battle of Moscow, as part of Operation Barbarossa. The city was under full or partial German occupation from October 12 to December 30, 1941. In 1944, the Soviet Government used its local military buildings to intern hundreds of Polish prisoners of war — soldiers of the Polish underground Home Army — whom the advancing Soviet front had arrested in the area around Vilnius.

Administrative and municipal status 
Kaluga is the administrative center of the oblast.<ref name="Ref174">Charter of Kaluga Oblast</ref> Within the framework of administrative divisions, it is, together with seventy-two rural localities, incorporated as the City of Kaluga—an administrative unit with the status equal to that of the districts. As a municipal division, the City of Kaluga, together with one rural locality in Ferzikovsky District (the selo of Novozhdamirovo), is incorporated as Kaluga Urban Okrug.

 Economy 
In Kaluga, Kaluga Turbine Plant is located, is part of the company Power Machines; Kaluga Machine Works manufactures track machines for railways, plant a foreign company MACO Door & Window.

In recent years Kaluga has become one center of the Russian automotive industry, with a number of foreign companies opening assembly plants in the area:

On November 28, 2007, Volkswagen Group opened a new assembly plant in Kaluga, which further expanded by 2009. The investment has reached more than 500 million Euro.  the plant assembled the Volkswagen Passat, Škoda Fabia and Škoda Rapid.

On October 15, 2007, the Volvo Group broke ground on a new truck assembly plant, that was inaugurated on January 19, 2009, with a yearly capacity of 10,000 Volvo and 5,000 Renault trucks.

On December 12, 2007, PSA Peugeot Citroën announced its decision to build a new assembly plant in Kaluga. By March 2010 the plant was operational, building Peugeot 308s for the Russian market and would also produce Citroën and Mitsubishi models.

 Transportation 
The city is served by the Grabtsevo Airport. Since 1899, there has been a railway connection between Kaluga and Moscow.

Public transportation is represented by the trolleybuses, buses, and marshrutkas (routed taxis).

 Climate 
Kaluga has a humid temperate continental (Köppen climate classification: Dfb''), with warm and humid summers; and long, cold and snowy winters.

Notable people 
Kaluga's most famous resident was rocket science pioneer Konstantin Tsiolkovsky.

Other notable people include:
Alexander Amfiteatrov
Yuri Averbakh, chess grandmaster
Mykola Azarov
Pafnuty Chebyshev, mathematician
Alexander Chizhevsky
David Edelstadt
Alexander Gretchaninov, Russian-American composer
Jonah of Hankou
Andrei Kalaychev
Valery Kobelev, ski jumper
Mikhail Linge
Pavel Popovich, cosmonaut, the only person to receive two honorary citizenships of Kaluga (1962 and 1964)
Nikolai Rakov
Imam Shamil
Nikolay Skvortsov, swimmer
Yuliya Tabakova
Georgy Zhukov
Olesya Zykina, 400m athlete
Bulat Okudzhava, lived and taught Literature in public school in 1980th.
Serafim Tulikov
Ivan Kuliak

Twin towns – sister cities

Kaluga is twinned with:

 Suhl, Germany (1969)
 Lahti, Finland (1998)
 Tiraspol, Moldova (2005)
 Panorama, Greece (2011)
 Minsk, Belarus (2015)
 Binzhou, China (2015)
 Yalta, Ukraine (2016)
 Niš, Serbia (2017)

Partner cities
In addition to twin towns, Kaluga cooperates with:

 Clearwater, United States (1992)
 Xianyang, China (2000)
 Tula, Russia (2002)
 Oryol, Russia (2003)
 Smolensk, Russia (2003)
 Makhachkala, Russia (2012)
 Tsiolkovsky, Russia (2016)
 Ryazan, Russia (2017)
 Tambov, Russia (2017)
 Pardubice, Czech Republic (2019)

Gallery

References

Notes

Sources

External links 

 
Official website of Kaluga
Kaluga Business Directory 
Article in German about Kaluga plant
 

 
Kaluzhsky Uyezd
Golden Ring of Russia